The 1934 Coupe de France Final was a football match held at Stade Olympique Yves-du-Manoir, Colombes on May 6, 1934, that saw FC Sète defeat Olympique de Marseille 2–1 thanks to goals by Istvan Lukacs.

Match details

See also

1933–34 Coupe de France

External links
Coupe de France results at Rec.Sport.Soccer Statistics Foundation
Report on French federation site

Coupe
1934
Coupe De France Final 1934
Coupe De France Final 1934
Sport in Hauts-de-Seine
Coupe de France Final
Coupe de France Final